William Roy "Red" Moore Jr. (December 14, 1922 – December 14, 2011) was an American football player and coach. He played college football at Pennsylvania State University and three seasons in the National Football League (NFL) with the Pittsburgh Steelers (1947–1949).   captained the Penn State Nittany Lions football team in 1946. Moore served as the head football coach at Allegheny College in Meadville, Pennsylvania for four seasons, from 1954 to 1957, compiling a record of 11–19–2. He died on his 89th birthday in 2011.

References

External links
 

1922 births
2011 deaths
American football guards
American football tackles
Allegheny Gators football coaches
Cornell Big Red football coaches
Penn State Nittany Lions football players
Pittsburgh Steelers players
United States Navy personnel of World War II
United States Navy sailors
People from Beaver County, Pennsylvania
Sportspeople from Pittsburgh
Coaches of American football from Pennsylvania
Players of American football from Pittsburgh